Richard Martini may refer to:
Richard Martini (director) (born 1955), American film director
Richard Martini (footballer) (born 1978), French footballer
Rich Martini, American football player